The Iran Freedom Support Act (120 Stat. 1344, enacted September 30, 2006) is an Act of Congress that appropriated $10 million and directed the President of the United States to spend that money in support of "pro-democracy groups" opposed to the Iranian government. Opponents claimed the bill was a first step towards a US-led invasion of the country.  

In response to the passage of the bill, President George W. Bush lauded the Congress "for demonstrating its bipartisan commitment to confronting the Iranian regime's repressive and destabilizing activities."

Possible recipients of money
American authorities have refused to announce the names of groups that have received money under this act, and no group has officially acknowledged this either.

Reaction
Following introduction of the bill in the Senate, Iran responded "those who draft such plans lag behind the times, they live in their daydreams."

References

External links
Full text of earlier failed Iran Freedom and Support Act of 2004 (S. 2681)
Full text of  earlier failed Iran Freedom and Support Act of 2005 (S. 333)
US aid to Central Asia: "The rhetoric and the numbers are at odds with one another"

Acts of the 109th United States Congress
2006 in international relations
United States foreign relations legislation
United States federal defense and national security legislation
Iran–United States relations